Pastillus is a genus of Sap beetle.

Species
 Pastillus eminentithorax Hisamatsu, 2013

References

Nitidulidae